Markice Moore (born July 31, 1986), also known as Kesan, is an American actor, rapper and reality TV personality. He is best known for playing Ryan Payne in Tyler Perry's The Paynes

Career 
Moore is known for MTV's From G's to Gents (Season 1) and Warner Bros. Pictures' ATL.  He is best known from punching fellow cast member E6 in the face during the reunion episode of MTV's From G's To Gents (Season 1).

In 2012, Moore portrayed Andrew on The Walking Dead television series. Moore had originally auditioned for the role of T-Dog, which went to IronE Singleton.

In 2018, he earned the role of Ryan Payne on the OWN sitcom, Tyler Perry's The Paynes. Moore's character, Ryan.

Legal problems 
In 2010, Moore was charged with cruelty to children, after police investigators determined that he assaulted his infant daughter.

In 2011 the charges against Moore were suspended. He went on to marry his child's mother and had another baby girl.

Filmography

Television

Film

References

External links 
Kesan's Website

Markice Moore at MySpace

1986 births
21st-century American male actors
21st-century American rappers
American rappers
Living people
Place of birth missing (living people)